Peter Mattias Oscarsson (born 12 April 1975 in Västerås) is a Swedish sprint canoer who competed in the mid-1990s. He finished sixth in the K-4 1000 m event at the 1996 Summer Olympics in Atlanta.

References
 Sports-Reference.com profile

1975 births
Canoeists at the 1996 Summer Olympics
Living people
Olympic canoeists of Sweden
Swedish male canoeists
Sportspeople from Västerås